In mathematics, an invariant measure is a measure that is preserved by some function. The function may be a geometric transformation. For examples, circular angle is invariant under rotation, hyperbolic angle is  invariant under squeeze mapping, and a difference of slopes is invariant under shear mapping.

Ergodic theory is the study of invariant measures in dynamical systems. The Krylov–Bogolyubov theorem proves the existence of invariant measures under certain conditions on the function and space under consideration.

Definition

In terms of the pushforward measure, this states that 

The collection of measures (usually probability measures) on  that are invariant under  is sometimes denoted  The collection of ergodic measures,  is a subset of  Moreover, any convex combination of two invariant measures is also invariant, so  is a convex set;  consists precisely of the extreme points of 

When the dynamical system can be described by a transfer operator, then the invariant measure is an eigenvector of the operator, corresponding to an eigenvalue of  this being the largest eigenvalue as given by the Frobenius-Perron theorem.

Examples

 Consider the real line  with its usual Borel σ-algebra; fix  and consider the translation map  given by:  Then one-dimensional Lebesgue measure  is an invariant measure for 
 The invariant measure in the first example is unique up to trivial renormalization with a constant factor. This does not have to be necessarily the case: Consider a set consisting of just two points  and the identity map  which leaves each point fixed. Then any probability measure  is invariant. Note that  trivially has a decomposition into -invariant components  and 
 Area measure in the Euclidean plane is invariant under the special linear group  of the  real matrices of determinant 
 Every locally compact group has a Haar measure that is invariant under the group action.

See also

References

 John von Neumann (1999) Invariant measures, American Mathematical Society 

Dynamical systems
Measures (measure theory)